Kelluyo (Aymara Q'illuyu, q'illu yellow, uyu corral, "yellow corral") is one of seven districts of the Chucuito Province in Peru.

Geography 
Other mountains are listed below:

Ethnic groups 
The people in the district are mainly indigenous citizens of Aymara descent. Aymara is the language which the majority of the population (84.47%) learnt to speak in childhood, 14.50% of the residents started speaking using the Spanish language (2007 Peru Census).

See also 
 Parinaquta
 Quraquta

References